4-Nonylphenylboronic acid is a potent and selective inhibitor of the enzyme fatty acid amide hydrolase (FAAH), with an IC50 of 9.1nM, and 870x selectivity for FAAH over the related enzyme MAGL, which it inhibits with an IC50 of 7900nM. It is also a weaker inhibitor of the enzymes endothelial lipase and lipoprotein lipase, with  values of 100 nM and 1400 nM respectively.

See also 
 IDFP
 LY-2183240
 URB-597

References 

Enzyme inhibitors
Boronic acids